Just Me is the twelfth studio album by American singer Brian McKnight. It was released by E1 Music on July 12, 2011 in the United States. It includes the singles "Fall 5.0" and "Temptation," the latter of which features McKnight's son Brian McKnight Jr. Additionally, a deluxe edition was released exclusively through Walmart and featured a live CD/DVD set.

Critical reception
{{Album ratings
| rev1 = Boston Globe
| rev1Score = <ref name="bostonglobe">{{cite web |url=http://archive.boston.com/ae/music/cd_reviews/articles/2011/07/12/brian_mcknight_just_me/|title=Brian McKnight: "Just Me|last=Capobianco|first=Ken|date=July 12, 2011|website=Boston Globe |accessdate=January 13, 2020}}</ref>
| rev2 = SoulTracks
| rev2Score = mixed
}}

Ken Capobianco from The Boston Globe'' found that "all the tunes are artfully arranged and lean; only one exceeds four minutes. This works to his advantage, especially on "Just Me", a lovely ballad, and on the upbeat “Gimme Yo Love" [...] The best tracks avoid the oh-so-tasteful vibe that has marred some of his studio work." In her review for SoulTracks, editor Melody Charles wrote that "thanks to his longevity and versatility as a performer, Brian McKnight couldn’t be blamed if he decided to fall back a bit; but instead, the melismatic maestro puts that name and reputation on the line in an effort to include the newest McKnight generation, returning – with a pair of his musically-inclined sons in tow – for his eleventh CD, the dubiously-titled Just Me.."

Track listing 
All tracks are produced by Brian McKnight.

Charts

References

2011 albums
Albums produced by Brian McKnight
Brian McKnight albums
E1 Music albums